Temptation is a tribute album to Tom Waits, by Holly Cole. Originally released in Canada in 1995 on Alert Records, it was also released internationally in 1995 on the Metro Blue imprint of Capitol Records.

Track listing
All songs written by Tom Waits.

 "Take Me Home" – 2:27
 "Train Song" – 3:26
 "Jersey Girl" – 3:45
 "Temptation" – 3:05
 "Falling Down" – 5:18
 "Invitation to the Blues" – 4:23
 "Cinny's Waltz" – 2:34
 "Frank's Theme" – 3:10
 "Little Boy Blue" – 2:58
 "I Don't Wanna Grow Up" – 4:30
 "Tango Til They're Sore" – 4:28
 "(Looking For) The Heart of Saturday Night" – 3:37
 "Soldiers Things" – 3:23
 "I Want You" – 2:56
 "Good Old World" – 1:35
 "The Briar and the Rose" – 5:28
 "Shiver Me Timbers" – 4:32

Personnel
Musicians
 Cyro Baptista – percussion
 Anne Bourne – cello
 Dougie Bowne – drums
 Kevin Breit – guitar, national steel guitar, slide guitar
 Holly Cole – vocals
 The Colettes – background vocals
 Charles Daellenbach – tuba
 Aaron Davis – arranger, brass arrangement, piano, string arrangements
 Rhoda Dog – vocals
 Phil Dwyer – horn arrangements, alto sax, baritone sax
 Anne Lederman – violin
 Howard Levy – harmonica
 Fred Mills – trumpet
 David Ohanian – french horn
 Douglas Perry – viola
 David Piltch – arranger, bass, acoustic bass, percussion
 Ronald Romm – trumpet
 Earl Seymour – horn arrangements, baritone sax
 Eugene Watts – trombone
 Perry White – horn arrangements, tenor sax

Production
 Robin Aubé – assistant engineer
 Julian Baglioni – assistant engineer
 W. Tom Berry – executive producer
 Sandeep Bhandari – assistant engineer
 Rodney Bowes – design
 Bill Emmons – assistant engineer
 Victor Florencia – assistant engineer
 Scott James – assistant engineer
 Fred Kervorkian – assistant engineer
 Danny Kopelson – engineer
 Andrew MacNaughtan – photography
 Jo Rossi – assistant engineer
 Doug Sax – mastering
 Craig Street – producer

References

Holly Cole albums
1995 albums
Albums produced by Craig Street
Capitol Records albums
Tom Waits tribute albums